Le Macchie is a village in Tuscany, central Italy, administratively a frazione of the comune of Arcidosso, province of Grosseto, in the area of Mount Amiata. At the time of the 2001 census its population amounted to 101.

Geography
Le Macchie is about 58 km from Grosseto and 4 km from Arcidosso. It is situated along the Zancona river, near the village of the same name, in the valley of Monte Labbro.

The village is composed by three hamlets: Macchie, Pastorelli and Poggio Marco.

References

External links

See also 
 Bagnoli, Arcidosso
 Montelaterone
 San Lorenzo, Arcidosso
 Salaiola
 Stribugliano
 Zancona

Frazioni of Arcidosso